In Greek mythology, Pieris was one of the names given for the slave who was the mother, by Menelaus, of Megapenthes. Homer's Odyssey, and the geographer Pausanias, mention that Megapenthes was the illegitimate son of Menelaus, king of Mycenaean Sparta, by a slave, without naming her. But according to the mythographer Apollodorus:
Menelaus had ... by a female slave Pieris, an Aetolian, or, according to Acusilaus, by Tereis, he had a son Megapenthes"

Other sources give other names for the slave who bore Megapenthes.

Notes

References
 Apollodorus, Apollodorus, The Library, with an English Translation by Sir James George Frazer, F.B.A., F.R.S. in 2 Volumes. Cambridge, Massachusetts, Harvard University Press; London, William Heinemann Ltd. 1921. . Online version at the Perseus Digital Library.
 Fowler, R. L., Early Greek Mythography: Volume 2: Commentary, Oxford University Press, 2013. .
 Grimal, Pierre, The Dictionary of Classical Mythology, Wiley-Blackwell, 1996. .
 Homer, The Odyssey with an English Translation by A.T. Murray, PH.D. in two volumes. Cambridge, Massachusetts, Harvard University Press; London, William Heinemann, Ltd. 1919. Online version at the Perseus Digital Library.
 Pausanias, Pausanias Description of Greece with an English Translation by W.H.S. Jones, Litt.D., and H.A. Ormerod, M.A., in 4 Volumes. Cambridge, Massachusetts, Harvard University Press; London, William Heinemann Ltd. 1918. Online version at the Perseus Digital Library.
 Tripp, Edward, Crowell's Handbook of Classical Mythology, Thomas Y. Crowell Co; First edition (June 1970). .

Women in Greek mythology